Mário Lunter (born June 20, 1994) is Slovak professional ice hockey forward who is currently playing for BK Mladá Boleslav in the Czech Extraliga.

Career
He returned to Bratislava for a second stint from HC ’05 Banská Bystrica, securing a one-year deal on July 19, 2018.

Career statistics

International

References

External links

1994 births
Living people
HC '05 Banská Bystrica players
Sportspeople from Banská Bystrica
Slovak ice hockey right wingers
MHk 32 Liptovský Mikuláš players
HC Slovan Bratislava players
BK Mladá Boleslav players
Slovak expatriate ice hockey players in the Czech Republic